HMS Ruby was a 64-gun third-rate ship of the line of the Royal Navy, launched on 26 November 1776 at Woolwich. She was converted to serve as a receiving ship in 1813 and was broken up in 1821.

Service history
The British ships Ruby, Captain Michael John Everitt,  (or Eolus), 32, and the sloop , 18, were cruising off Hayti, when on 2 June 1779, in the Bay of Gonave, they fell in with the 36-gun French frigate , Captain d'Escars. Ruby chased Prudente for some hours and was much annoyed by the well-directed fire of the enemy's stern-chasers, by which Captain Everitt and a sailor lost their lives. When within easy range of Prudente, at about sunset, Ruby compelled her to strike, with the loss of two killed and three wounded. The British Navy took Prudente into service under the same name.

Ruby was at Plymouth on 20 January 1795 and so shared in the proceeds of the detention of the Dutch naval vessels, East Indiamen, and other merchant vessels that were in port on the outbreak of war between Britain and the Netherlands.

Ruby, under Captain Henry Edwyn Stanhope, sailed with the first squadron (under Capt John Blankett) to take part in the 1st British Occupation of the Cape, leaving England on 27 February 1795. There she was used on patrols and general duties but saw no action.
the Battle of Muizenberg on 7 August 1795 triggered the collapse of the Dutch forces which controlled the Cape of Good Hope at the time.

On 13 July 1800 Ruby was escorting a convoy from St Helena to Great Britain when at  when she sighted a strange sail that appeared to be a French privateer. Winds were light and next morning Ruby sighted the privateer some three miles ahead. Ruby was unable to catch the privateer, which made use of sweeps to remain just out of gunshot. Towards evening a breeze came up and Ruby succeeded in capturing the privateer at 1a.m. on 15 July.

She was a new vessel, strongly built, fully copper-fastened, and a good sailer. She was on only her second cruise. She had been out a month but had succeeded only in capturing the brig Fame, which had been sailing from Sierra Leone to London. La Fortune was armed with sixteen 18-pounder guns, four long iron 12-pounder guns, and two 36-pounder brass carronades. She had a complement of 202 men, but she had put 14 on board Fame as a prize crew. Captain Solomon Ferris, of Ruby, recommended that the Navy acquire La Fortune.

On 25 June 1807, Tsar Alexander I and Napoleon entered an accord at Tilsit, one of the secret clauses of which entailed the joint seizure of the Portuguese fleet. This led Napoleon to send a large army into Portugal in October 1807, with a demand that Portugal should detain all British ships and sequester British property. This led to the departure of a Naval Squadron under Sir Sidney Smith to blockade the Tagus estuary. The squadron consisted of the Hibernia (120 guns), the London (98), the Foudroyant (80) and Elizabeth, Conqueror, Marlborough, Monarch, Plantagenet and Bedford (all78s).
On arrival Smith arranged for the Portuguese Royal Family, all the serviceable Portuguese fleet and 20 armed merchantmen to leave for Brazil, which they did on 29 October. Smith and his squadron accompanied them part of the way, leaving Marlborough, London, Monarch and Bedford to escort the fleet to Brazil.
On 30 October a Russian squadron under Admiral Seniavin entered Lisbon, where they became blockaded by the return of Smith's squadron. 
A few days after the Tsar's hostile declaration became known in London, five ships left Portsmouth to reinforce the blockade. These were the Ganges Defence and Alfred (74s) and Ruby and Agamemnon (64s). On arrival at the Tagus they enabled the Foudroyant, Conqueror and Plantagenet to leave for Cadiz.

The blockade continued for some time, as evidenced by this extract from a letter written by a seaman, John Williams, on board HMS Ruby off Lisbon in June 1808 :
"We are at present at anchor at the mouth of the harbour in sight of our Enemies. We are in sight of all of their Shipping with a naked eye there is of them 13 Saile of the Line of Battle Ships & 25 Sloops and Brigs of War all the Gun Boats we do not know the number of them. We are only 10 Saile of the Line and 2 Frigates 2 Sloops and Brigs. There is very heavy Batteries which the French has got the possession of them one of them has mounted as many heavy guns as there is Days in a year. We expect orders to go in Every Day So Dear Brother Remember me in your prayer."
All seems to have gone well, since on 15 October 1808 John Williams again wrote home from HMS Ruby at Spithead.

Notes

References

 Lavery, Brian (2003) The Ship of the Line - Volume 1: The development of the battlefleet 1650-1850. Conway Maritime Press. .

External links
 

Ships of the line of the Royal Navy
Intrepid-class ships of the line
1776 ships
War of 1812 ships of the United Kingdom